Emmanuel Ullmo (born 25 June 1965) is a French mathematician, specialised in arithmetic geometry. Since 2013 he has served as director of the Institut des Hautes Études scientifiques.

Biography 
He wrote his thesis under Lucien Szpiro at the University of Paris-Sud in 1993, where he was appointed professor in 2001. He also held temporary positions at IMPA for 18 months, then two years at Princeton University, and six months at Tsinghua University.

He was an editor of the journal Inventiones mathematicae between 2007 and 2014.

In 2013, following the retirement of Jean-Pierre Bourguignon, he became the 5th director of the IHÉS.

Awards 
He was an invited speaker at the International Congress of Mathematicians at Beijing in 2002.  Between 2003 and 2008 he was a junior fellow at the Institut de France.  He received the Elie Cartan Prize of the French Academy of Sciences in 2006 for his work on the proof of the Bogomolov conjecture with Shou-Wu Zhang.

References 

1965 births
Living people
French mathematicians
Arithmetic geometers
Academic staff of Paris-Sud University
University of Paris alumni